Nationality words link to articles with information on the nation's poetry or literature (for instance, Irish or France).

Events

Works published

France
 Guillaume de Salluste Du Bartas, Seconde Semaine ou Enfance du monde, unfinished.
 Pierre de Ronsard, the collective in-folio edition of his works
 Honoré d'Urfé, La Sireine

Great Britain
 Robert Greene, The Debate between Folly and Love, translated from the French of part of Louise Labbe's Débat de Folie et d'Amour, London: Ponsonby; many editions in the 16th, 17th and 19th centuries
King James VI, The Essayes of a Prentise, in the Divine Art of Poesie
 Anthony Munday, I Serve a Mistress
 Thomas Phaer, The Thirteen Books of Aeneidos, Boox 10–12 translated by Thomas Twyne; Book 13 by Maffeo Vegio (see also The Seven First Bookes 1558, The Nyne First Bookes 1562, The Whole Twelve Bookes 1573)
 Clement Robinson "and Divers Others", A Handful of Pleasant DelightsOther
 Jan Kochanowski, Frazski'' ("Trifles"), Poland

Births
 February 12 – Barlaeus, also known as Kaspar van Baerle (died 1648), Dutch
 September 15 – Georg Rudolf Weckherlin (died 1653), German
 Also:
 Francis Beaumont (died 1616), English playwright and poet
 Anna Ovena Hoyer born (died 1655), German
 Anna Visscher (died 1651), Dutch  artist, poet, and translator
 Georg Rodolf Weckherlin born (died 1653), German
 Diederich von dem Werder born (died 1657), German

Deaths
 March 10 – Thomas Norton (born 1532), politician and poet
 August 22 – Jan Kochanowski (born 1530), Pole who published poetry in Polish and Latin
 Also:
 Johann Beltz (born 1529), German
 Lucas de Heere (born 1534), Flemish portrait painter, poet and writer
 Guy Du Faur, Seigneur de Pibrac (born 1529), French jurist and poet
 Sur, died sometime from 1581 to this year (born 1478 or 1479), Indian, Hindi poet and saint who wrote in the Brij Bhasha dialect
 1584/1585/1586: Ulpian Fulwell (born 1545/1546), English Renaissance theatre playwright, satirist and poet

See also

 Poetry
 16th century in poetry
 16th century in literature
 Dutch Renaissance and Golden Age literature
 Elizabethan literature
 French Renaissance literature
 Renaissance literature
 Spanish Renaissance literature
 University Wits

Notes

16th-century poetry
Poetry